Pardew is a surname. Notable people with the surname include:

 Alan Pardew (born 1961), English football manager and former player
 James W. Pardew (1944–2021), American diplomat and military officer

See also
 Pardey
 Perdew